Wecock Farm is a 1970s council estate on the western edges of Waterlooville originally built by Portsmouth City Council.  Its lineage can be traced back to the 16th century and is described as 'a place called Wycock' in 1591

The estate's centre was redeveloped in 2003 with new housing, and new buildings for the community centre and a popular Chinese take-away.

References

Housing estates in Hampshire